Rosine Luguet (1921–1981) was a French stage and film actress. She was the daughter of the actor André Luguet.

Selected filmography
 Premier rendez-vous (1941)
 The Benefactor (1942)
 Annette and the Blonde Woman (1942)
 Paris Frills (1945)
 Pastoral Symphony (1946)
 Branquignol (1949)
 The Father of the Girl (1953)
 Ah! Les belles bacchantes (1954)
 Mademoiselle (1966)

References

Bibliography
 Ann C. Paietta. Saints, Clergy and Other Religious Figures on Film and Television, 1895-2003. McFarland, 2005.

External links

1921 births
1981 deaths
French film actresses
French stage actresses
Actresses from Paris
20th-century French actresses